Masahiro Yamamoto may refer to:

Masahiro Yamamoto (baseball) (born 1965), Japanese baseball player
Masahiro Yamamoto (kickboxer) (born 1983), Japanese kickboxer